Jennifer ("Jen") Lancaster (born November 5, 1967) is an American author whose titles have appeared on The New York Times Best Seller list. 

Lancaster was an associate vice president for a technology company prior to being laid off after 9/11. Being laid off, and her adaptation to being unemployed, became the subject matter for her blog and, later, her books.

Lancaster was raised in Indiana and now resides in Chicago, Illinois with her husband, Fletch, and their many pets. She is an alumna of Purdue University. She is known for her humor and rampant narcissism which is mentioned in her books.

Publications
 Bitter is the New Black; memoir: released 2006
 Bright Lights, Big Ass; memoir: released 2007
 Such a Pretty Fat; memoir: released 2008
 Pretty in Plaid; memoir: released 2010
 My Fair Lazy; memoir: released 2010
 If You Were Here; fiction: released 2011
 Here I Go Again; fiction: released 2012
 Jeneration X; memoir: released 2013
 The Tao of Martha; memoir: released 2014
 Twisted Sisters; fiction: released 2014
 I Regret Nothing; memoir: released 2015
 The Best of Enemies; fiction: released 2015
 By the Numbers; fiction: released 2016
 The Gatekeepers; fiction: released 2017
 Stories I'd Tell in Bars; memoir: released 2017
 Welcome to the United States of Anxiety; memoir released 2020

References

External links 
 Jennsylvania: Author's Blog

Living people
American humorists
American bloggers
1967 births
21st-century American women writers
Writers from Indiana
Writers from Chicago
American women bloggers
American women non-fiction writers
21st-century American non-fiction writers
Women humorists